The men's 400 metres hurdles event at the 1992 World Junior Championships in Athletics was held in Seoul, Korea, at Olympic Stadium on 16, 17 and 18 September.

Medalists

Results

Final
18 September

Semifinals
17 September

Semifinal 1

Semifinal 2

Heats
16 September

Heat 1

Heat 2

Heat 3

Heat 4

Heat 5

Participation
According to an unofficial count, 32 athletes from 24 countries participated in the event.

References

400 metres hurdles
400 metres hurdles at the World Athletics U20 Championships